Sin: The Movie is a Japanese cyberpunk action horror film original video animation released in 2000 by ADV Films, adapted from the game of the same title.

Release
Sin: The Movie was released on VHS and DVD in 2000 in both Japan and USA. The special edition DVD was released in 2003 with more extra features. In 2009, the film was re-released on DVD.

Further reading

External links 
 
 

2000 anime OVAs
2000 horror films
2000 action films
Action anime and manga
Japanese action horror films
Cyberpunk anime and manga
Cyberpunk films
Horror anime and manga
Japanese action films
Japanese horror films
ADV Films
OVAs based on video games
2000 films
Direct-to-video action films
Direct-to-video horror films
Japanese direct-to-video films
Anime films based on video games
Biopunk anime and manga
Films scored by Masamichi Amano